Praça da Sé (English: See Square) is a public space in São Paulo, Brazil. Considered as the city's central point, it is the point from where the distance of all roads passing through São Paulo are counted. The square was the location of many historical events in São Paulo's history, most notably during the Diretas Já movement. The name originates from the episcopal see of the city, the São Paulo Cathedral.

History 

Originally known as Largo da Sé (Field of the See), the square developed around the religious building which preceded the cathedral and surrounding edifices. At the beginning of the 20th century, older structures were demolished, and the downtown area was reconstructed according to the time's urban planning. Its geography has remained mostly unchanged since.

Landscape project 
The current landscape is the result of a 1970s project by architects led by José Eduardo de Assis Lefèvre. The opening of a nearby São Paulo Metro station required the leveling of an entire city block, requiring an entirely new landscaping infrastructure.

The architects were heavily influenced by contemporary landscaping works underway on the US's west coast (such as those by Lawrence Halprin), characterized by rigorous geometry, through multiple levels with reflecting pools and prism-like land masses.

Renovation 

The square underwent a significant revitalization during 2006, having been partially re-inaugurated on January 25, 2007 (the city's anniversary) by then-mayor Gilberto Kassab. The renovation came under intense criticism by NGOs working with the homeless who claimed that the new square reduced the space available for existing homeless people

The renovation includes the relocation of flower boxes, the increase in the integration between existing sculptures and their surroundings, and the introduction of pedestrian overpasses over the existing reflecting pools.

Monuments

References

Bibliography 
MACEDO, Silvio Soares e ROBBA, Fábio; Praças brasileiras; São Paulo:Edusp;

External links 
Sampa.art.br 
Historical Assets Administration of the City of São Paulo 
SampaCentro 

Buildings and structures in São Paulo
Squares in São Paulo
Tourist attractions in São Paulo
1970 establishments in Brazil